The  is a Japanese private railway line in Yamanashi Prefecture, between Ōtsuki Station in Ōtsuki and Kawaguchiko Station in Fujikawaguchiko. It is the only railway line operated by Fuji Kyuko.

Service outline
Local trains (which stop at all stations) run about every 30 minutes. As well as these, several Fujisan Tokkyu (Mount Fuji express) services are operated. The line is mountainous, climbing from Otsuki (358 metres above sea level) to Kawaguchiko (857 metres above sea level): a 500-metre ascent over the 26.6 kilometre route. In many places, Mount Fuji can be seen from the train.

The Fujikyuko Line is the only railway service to access the northern Yamanashi side of Mount Fuji and Fuji Five Lakes, part of Fuji-Hakone-Izu National Park. However, direct and frequent highway bus services from Shinjuku terminal to Fujiyoshida and Kawaguchiko are faster and more convenient when travelling from Tokyo. There are not many direct services from Tokyo to the Fuji Kyūkō Line apart from a few seasonal rapid trains at weekends and some local commuter trains.

Fuji Kyuko railway and bus lines accept Pasmo, Suica, and other IC farecards. The railway was provided with the capability from 14 March 2015.

The Fuji Kyuko established "Fuji Sanroku Electric Railway" (Ja:富士山麓電気鉄道/ Fuji Sanroku Denki Tetsudo) in May 2021 because the company will split Fuji Kyuko railway department from 1 April 2022. And, Fujikyuko Line will surely belong to "Fuji San-Roku Denki Tetsudo" from 1 April 2022.

Basic data
Distance (Ōtsuki — Kawaguchiko): 26.6 km
Ōtsuki Line (Ōtsuki — Mt. Fuji): 23.6 km 
Kawaguchiko Line (Mt. Fuji — Kawaguchiko): 3.0 km

It is a single-track railway, but there are passing loops at about half the stations. The Ōtsuki Line runs roughly SW from Ōtsuki to Mount Fuji), and the Kawaguchiko Line runs roughly NW from Mount Fuji to Kawaguchiko.

Stations 
 All stations are located in Yamanashi Prefecture.

Legend
O: Trains stop at this station
|: Trains do not stop at this station

History
The Tsuru Horse-drawn Tramway opened a  gauge line from Tsurushi to Shimoyoshida in 1900. In 1903, the Fuji Horse-drawn Tramway opened a  gauge line from Otsuki to Kasei, the same year the Tsuru Horse-drawn Tramway was extended from Tsurushi to Kasei, and from Shimoyoshida to Fuji-yoshida (present-day Fujisan).In 1921, the two companies merged, converted the Otsuki to Kasei section to 762 mm gauge, and electrified the line.

The line was extended from Fuji-yoshida to Kawaguchiko, opening on 24 August 1950. The operating company was renamed Fujikyuko from 25 May 1960.

Freight services on the line were discontinued from 1 April 1978.

Rolling stock
 Fujikyu 1000 series
 Fujikyu 1200 series (Fuji Tozan train)
 Fujikyu 6000 series (since February 2012)
 Fujikyu 8000 series (Fujisan Limited Express services since 12 July 2014)
 Fujikyu 8500 series (Fujisan View Express services from 23 April 2016)

Former rolling stock
 Fujikyu 2000 series (Fujisan Limited Express services, February 2002 - 7 February 2016)

The last remaining 2000 series set was withdrawn after its final run on 7 February 2016.

 Fujikyu 5000 series (Tomasland Express services,　2007 - 2019)

See also
Tenjō-Yama Park Mt. Kachi Kachi Ropeway
List of railway companies in Japan
List of railway lines in Japan

References
This article incorporates material from the corresponding article in the Japanese Wikipedia

External links

 

Railway lines in Japan
Rail transport in Yamanashi Prefecture
Railway lines opened in 1900
1900 establishments in Japan
1067 mm gauge railways in Japan